Le Thor is a commune in the Vaucluse department in the Provence-Alpes-Côte d'Azur region in southeastern France.

It has an attractive Romanesque church, Notre-Dame-du-Lac.

Population

Notable residents
Alexey Brodovitch (1898–1971), graphic designer of Russian descent.
Pierre Salinger (1925-2004), a White House Press Secretary to U.S. Presidents John F. Kennedy and Lyndon B. Johnson, lived in "La Bastide rose" until his death.

See also
Communes of the Vaucluse department

References

External links
 Town's website

Communes of Vaucluse